Golf in the 27th Southeast Asian Games was held at Royal Myanmar Golf Course in Naypyidaw, Myanmar from 15–18 December.

Medal table

Medal summary

Men

Women

References

 
2013
2013 Southeast Asian Games
Southeast Asian Games
2013 Southeast Asian Games events